The 2016 Baltic Futsal Cup was held from December 9 to 11, 2016 in Latvia.

Standings

Matches

Goalscorers 
3 goals
  Maksims Seņs

1 goal

  Oskars Ikstens
  Andrejs Aleksejevs
  Igors Lapkovskis
  Igor Ivanov
  Pavel Smolkov
  Jurij Jeremejev

Own goals
  Igors Avanesovs (vs. Lithuania)

Awards 

 Top Scorer
  Germans Matjušenko (3 goals)

References

External links 
Futsal Planet

2016
2016 in Lithuanian football
2016 in Latvian football
2016 in Estonian football
International futsal competitions hosted by Latvia
2016–17 in European futsal